Terebra subulata is a species of sea snail, a marine gastropod mollusk in the family Terebridae, the auger snails.

Description
They have about 25 well-rounded whorls and a pointed spire. The aperture is very small and the outer lip is thin. The columella is twisted and the fasciole small. The anterior canal is truncated and curved. The shell is sculptured with fine axial threads and irregular weak spiral grooves, and the area below the suture raised into a spiral band. The color of the shell is cream with two rows of dark brown square blotches on the early whorls and three rows on the body whorl.

Distribution and habitat
This species can be found from the coast of East Africa and Madagascar to Eastern Polynesia, Japan, Hawaii, and Australia, at depth of 0 to 10 m.

Diet
Terebra subulata feeds on sand-dwelling Polychaeta and Enteropneusta. The prey is stung with the snail's radula teeth and paralysed by a venom, which is toxic to annelids and nematodes, but harmless to vertebrates.

References

 Bratcher T. & Cernohorsky W.O. (1987). Living terebras of the world. A monograph of the recent Terebridae of the world. American Malacologists, Melbourne, Florida & Burlington, Massachusetts. 240 pp.
 Terryn, Y. (2007). Terebridae: A Collectors Guide. Conchbooks & Natural Art. 59 pp + plates
 Severns, M. (2011). Shells of the Hawaiian Islands - The Sea Shells. Conchbooks, Hackenheim. 564 pp
 Liu, J.Y. [Ruiyu] (ed.). (2008). Checklist of marine biota of China seas. China Science Press. 1267 pp.
 Steyn, D. G.; Lussi, M. (2005). Offshore Shells of Southern Africa: A pictorial guide to more than 750 Gastropods. Published by the authors. pp. i–vi, 1–289.

External links
 Linnaeus, C. (1767). Systema naturae per regna tria naturae: secundum classes, ordines, genera, species, cum characteribus, differentiis, synonymis, locis. Ed. 12. 1., Regnum Animale. 1 & 2. Holmiae 
 Fedosov, A. E.; Malcolm, G.; Terryn, Y.; Gorson, J.; Modica, M. V.; Holford, M.; Puillandre, N. (2020). Phylogenetic classification of the family Terebridae (Neogastropoda: Conoidea). Journal of Molluscan Studies. 85(4): 359-388

Terebridae
Molluscs of the Indian Ocean
Molluscs of the Pacific Ocean
Molluscs described in 1758
Taxa named by Carl Linnaeus